ViewSonic Corporation is a Taiwanese-American privately held multinational electronics company with headquarters in Brea, California, United States and a research & development center in New Taipei City, Taiwan.

The company was founded in 1987 as Keypoint Technology Corporation by James Chu and was renamed to its present name in 1993, after a brand name of monitors launched in 1990. Today, ViewSonic specializes in visual display hardware—including liquid-crystal displays, projectors, and interactive whiteboards—as well as digital whiteboarding software. The company trades in three key markets: education, enterprise, and entertainment.

ViewSonic is a nationally certified minority-owned business by the Southern California Minority Supplier Development Council.

Company history
The company was initially founded as Keypoint Technology Corporation in 1987 by James Chu. In 1990 it launched the ViewSonic line of color computer monitors, and shortly afterward the company renamed itself after its monitor brand.

The ViewSonic logo features Gouldian finches, colorful birds native to Australia.

In the mid-1990s, ViewSonic rose to become one of the top-rated makers of computer CRT monitors, alongside Sony, NEC, MAG InnoVision, and Panasonic. ViewSonic soon displaced the rest of these companies to emerge as the largest display manufacturer from America/Japan at the turn of the millennium.

In 2000, ViewSonic acquired the Nokia Display Products' branded business.

In 2002 ViewSonic announced a 3840x2400 WQUXGA, 22.2-inch monitor, VP2290.

In 2005, ViewSonic and Tatung won a British patent lawsuit filed against them by LG Philips in a dispute over which company created technology for rear mounting of LCDs in a mobile PC (U.K. Patent GB2346464B, titled “portable computer").

On July 2, 2007, the company filed with the Securities and Exchange Commission to raise up to $143.8M in an IPO on NASDAQ.

On March 5, 2008, the company filed a withdraw request with the Securities and Exchange Commission saying "terms currently obtainable in the public marketplace are not sufficiently attractive to the Registrant to warrant proceeding with the initial public offering".

In 2017, ViewSonic entered the interactive whiteboard market with its ViewBoard flat panels and myViewBoard software. ViewSonic was named a best-selling collaboration display brand in 2018. By 2019, more than 5,500 elementary and junior high schools in the United States had installed ViewBoards, and ViewSonic ranked third in global interactive display market share, excluding China. ViewSonic became a Google for Education partner in 2019 and a Microsoft Education partner in 2020.

Operations 
ViewSonic has its headquarters in Brea, California, United States and a research & development center in New Taipei City, Taiwan. , ViewSonic is selling globally with offices in Canada, Germany, the United Kingdom, France, Russia, Italy, Ukraine, Turkey, Spain, Sweden, Greece, Switzerland, Australia, Taiwan, Malaysia, India, South Korea, United Arab Emirates, Singapore, Japan, and the United States.

Product history

In 1998, ViewSonic announced that two of its Professional Series monitors achieved TCO '99 certification.

In 2000, ViewSonic partnered with AT&T Corporation to offer Internet appliances integrated with the AT&T WorldNet Service, initially targeting the corporate market. The Internet appliances ranged from standalone i-boxes, integrated LCD and CRT devices, to web phones and wireless web pads. The units were deemed capable of operating on nearly any operating system, including Windows CE, Linux, QNX and VxWorks.

In 2002, ViewSonic announced a 3840x2400 WQUXGA, 22.2-inch monitor, VP2290.

At the 2007 Consumer Electronics Show, ViewSonic introduced display products, namely a projector, monitors and an HDTV set, capable of being connected directly to a video iPod.

On May 31, 2011, the ViewPad 7x debuted at the Computex computer show in Taipei, Taiwan, Pocket-Lint reported, being a follow-up rather than a replacement to ViewSonic's existing ViewPad 7 tablet, which runs Android 2.2, a.k.a. Froyo.

In 2017, ViewSonic rolled out its ViewBoard smart interactive whiteboards. By 2019, more than 5,500 elementary and junior high schools in the United States had installed ViewBoards, and ViewSonic ranked third in global interactive display market share (excluding China).

In 2018, ViewSonic announced myViewBoard software for digital whiteboards.

ViewSonic launched the world's first high brightness DLP 4K Ultra HD home projector, the PX747-4K.

See also

 List of computer system manufacturers

References

External links

 ViewSonic Corporation at Yahoo! Finance

Display technology companies
Computer companies of the United States
Technology companies based in Greater Los Angeles
Manufacturing companies based in Greater Los Angeles
Companies based in Brea, California
Computer companies established in 1987
American companies established in 1987
Computer companies of Taiwan
Companies based in New Taipei
Privately held companies based in California